Step Brothers Two is the second collaborative mixtape by American rappers Don Trip and Starlito. It was released independently on October 15, 2013, following up to their 2011 release of Step Brothers and preceding their 2017 release of Step Brothers Three. Production was handled by eleven record producers, including DJ Burn One, Drumma Boy, Sonny Digital, Street Symphony and Young Chop. It features guest appearances from Billy Falcon, Kevin Gates, Robin Raynelle and Singa B.

The album debuted at number 71 on the Billboard 200 albums chart in the United States. To date, this is the most charted project for both artists.

Track listing

Personnel 
 Jermaine Eric Shute – main artist
 Christopher "Don Trip" Wallace – main artist
 Kevin Jerome Gilyard – featured artist (track 3)
 Billy Falcon – featured artist (track 9)
 Robin Raynelle – featured artist (track 10)
 Singa B – featured artist (track 13)
 BarNone – producer (tracks: 1, 9)
 Torrance Esmond – producer (track 1)
 Christopher James Gholson – producer (tracks: 2, 5)
 Brian Pickens – producer (tracks: 3, 8, 12)
 Antoine Kearney – producer (track 4)
 Sonny Corey Uwaezuoke – producer (track 6)
 Charles "Chizzy" Stephens III – producer (track 7)
 Sarah J – producer (track 7)
 Terrance Hendry – producer (track 10)
 Tyree Pittman – producer (track 11)
 David Sweeten – producer (track 13)

Charts

References

External links 
 Step Brothers Two at Discogs

Sequel albums
Don Trip albums
Starlito albums
2013 mixtape albums
Collaborative albums
Albums produced by Drumma Boy
Albums produced by Young Chop
Albums produced by Sonny Digital
Albums produced by Street Symphony